Howard William Kissel (October 29, 1942 – February 24, 2012) was an American theater critic based in New York City. Before serving as the chief theatre critic for the Daily News for twenty years, Kissel was the arts editor for Women's Wear Daily. He also wrote a column for The Huffington Post. Kissel also authored a biography on theater producer David Merrick, entitled David Merrick, the Abominable Showman, which was published in 1993.

Kissel was born on October 29, 1942 in Milwaukee, Wisconsin and attended Shorewood High School. He graduated from Columbia University in 1964 and obtained his master's from Northwestern University. He was married to Christine Buck from 1974 until her death in 2006. Kissel died in Manhattan on February 24, 2012, aged 69. According to his sister, he had been suffering from health complications following a liver transplant in 2010.

References

1942 births
2012 deaths
20th-century American biographers
20th-century American male writers
20th-century American non-fiction writers
21st-century American male writers
21st-century American non-fiction writers
American theater critics
Columbia College (New York) alumni
HuffPost writers and columnists
New York Daily News people
Northwestern University alumni
Writers from Manhattan
Writers from Milwaukee